This list of gastropods described in 2012, is a list of new taxa of snails and slugs of every kind that have been described (following the rules of the ICZN) during the year 2012. The list only includes taxa at the level of genus or species. For changes in taxonomy above the level of genus, see Changes in the taxonomy of gastropods since 2005.

Fossil gastropods 

Acilia? basistriata Nützel, Aghababalou & Senowbari-Daryan, 2012
Agatrix agathe Landau, Petit & Da Silva, 2012
Amphitrochus balinensis Gründel, 2012
Ananias riccardii Pinilla, 2012
Anoptychia? luxemburgensis Gründel, 2012
Aphera aphrodite Landau, Petit & Da Silva, 2012
Axelella cativa Landau, Petit & Da Silva, 2012
Bahiensis priscus Cabrera & Martínez, 2012
Bivetiella dilatata Landau, Petit & Da Silva, 2012
Bulinus corici Harzhauser, Neubauer, Mandic, Zuschin & Ćorić, 2012
Cancellaria harzhauseri Landau, Petit & Da Silva, 2012
Cancellaria mixta Landau, Petit & Da Silva, 2012
Cidarina lenzaniyeuensis del Rio, 2012
Cryptaulax redelii Ferrari, 2012
Emmericia roetzeli Harzhauser & Neubauer in Harzhauser et al., 2012
Euclia alacertata Landau, Petit & Da Silva, 2012
Ferrissia crenellata Harzhauser & Neubauer in Harzhauser et al., 2012
Gyraulus sachsenhoferi Harzhauser & Neubauer in Harzhauser et al., 2012
Gyroscala daniana del Rio, 2012
Heteroterma carmeloi del Rio, 2012
Massyla toulai Landau, Petit & Da Silva, 2012
Microfulgur concheyroae del Rio, 2012
Nematurella zuschini Harzhauser & Neubauer in Harzhauser et al., 2012
Odontohydrobia groisenbachensis Harzhauser & Neubauer in Harzhauser et al., 2012
Odontohydrobia pompatica Harzhauser & Neubauer in Harzhauser et al., 2012
Odontohydrobia styriaca Harzhauser & Neubauer in Harzhauser et al., 2012

from Archiv für Molluskenkunde
Brasilennea guttula Salvador & Simone, 2012
Eoborus rotundus Salvador & Simone, 2012

from The Veliger:
Amarophos woodringi Landau & da Silva, 2012
Amarophos arayaensis Landau & da Silva, 2012
Harpa daisyae Landau, Frydman, & da Silva, 2012

 Other taxa

 genus Angulasina Gründel, 2012
 genus Europrotomus Kronenberg & Harzhauser, 2012
 genus Kaneconcha Kaim & Warén, 2012
 genus Montreuilopsis Gründel, 2012
 genus Myusurina Gründel, 2012

Marine gastropods 
Adfacelina Millen & Hermosillo, 2012
Adfacelina medinai Millen & Hermosillo, 2012
Austromitra decresca Simone & Cunha, 2012
Calliostoma tupinamba Dornellas, 2012
Dolichupis akangus Simone & Cunha, 2012
Dolichupis pingius Simone & Cunha, 2012
Dondice galaxiana Millen & Hermosillo, 2012
Microvoluta corona Simone & Cunha, 2012
Mitromorpha mirim Simone & Cunha, 2012
Mitromorpha sama Simone & Cunha, 2012
Natica juani Costa & Pastorino, 2012
Notocochlis laurae Costa & Pastorino, 2012
Onustus aquitanus Simone & Cunha, 2012
Paradoris adamsae Padula & Valdés, 2012
Philinopsis anneae Ornelas-Gatdula & Valdés, 2012
Pseudosimnia lacrima Simone & Cunha, 2012
Subcancilla joapyra Simone & Cunha, 2012
Terebra assu Simone & Cunha, 2012
Turricostellaria amphissa Simone & Cunha, 2012
Turricostellaria apyrahi Simone & Cunha, 2012
Turricostellaria jukyry Simone & Cunha, 2012
Turricostellaria ovir Simone & Cunha, 2012
Unidentia angelvaldesi Millen & Hermosillo, 2012

Other taxa
Family Unidentidae Millen & Hermosillo, 2012
Genus Unidentia Millen & Hermosillo, 2012

Freshwater gastropods 
from Journal of Conchology:
 Bithynia yildirimi Glöer & Georgiev, 2012
 Gyraulus nedyalkovi Glöer & Georgiev, 2012

from Journal of Molluscan Studies:
 Fluminicola gustafsoni Hershler & Liu, 2012

Land gastropods 

from Papéis Avulsos de Zoologia:
 Anostoma tessa Simone, 2012
 Kora corallina Simone, 2012
 Megalobulimus amandus Simone, 2012
 Spiripockia punctata Simone, 2012
 Spixia coltrorum Simone, 2012

from Journal of Conchology:
Escutiella Martínez-Orti & Borredà, 2012
Macedonica dobrostanica Irikov, 2012
 Plagyrona angusta Holyoak & Holyoak, 2012
 Ponentina curtivaginata Holyoak & Holyoak 2012
 Ponentina excentrica Holyoak & Holyoak 2012
 Ponentina foiaensis Holyoak & Holyoak 2012
 Ponentina grandiducta Holyoak & Holyoak 2012
 Ponentina monoglandulosa Holyoak & Holyoak 2012
 Ponentina octoglandulosa Holyoak & Holyoak 2012
 Ponentina papillosa Holyoak & Holyoak 2012
 Trochonanina mwanihanae Rowson & Van Goethem, 2012
 Upembella nonae Rowson & Van Goethem, 2012

from Archiv für Molluskenkunde:
 Echinix Thompson & Naranjo-García, 2012
 Echinix ochracea Thompson & Naranjo-García, 2012
 Echinix granulata Thompson & Naranjo-García, 2012
 Echinix rugosa Thompson & Naranjo-García, 2012

from Zoosystema:
 Cyclopedus anselini Gargominy & Muratov, 2012
 Cyclopedus Gargominy & Muratov, 2012
 Pseudosubulina theoripkeni Gargominy & Muratov, 2012
 Pseudosubulina nouraguensis Gargominy & Muratov, 2012

Other taxa
 genus Kora Simone, 2012
 genus Spiripockia Simone, 2012
 Pyramidula kuznetsovi Schileyko & Balashov, 2012

See also 
 List of gastropods described in 2011
 List of gastropods described in 2013

References 

Gastropods
 List